Gerald Robert Planutis (born May 18, 1930 in Detroit, Michigan – May 20, 2021) was a former American football halfback in the National Football League for the Washington Redskins. He played college football at Michigan State University and was drafted in the 12th round of the 1956 NFL Draft. Planutis attended West Hazleton High School and served in the United States Army. During his period in Free Territory of Trieste, he played football with a local team. He later appeared in two Rose Bowl games for the Spartans, and was head football coach at John Adams High School in South Bend, IN. He also head coached at Bridgman High School in Bridgman, Michigan. He resided in Bridgman, where he was commonly referred to as "Coach."

References

1930 births
2021 deaths
American football halfbacks
Michigan State Spartans football players
Players of American football from Detroit
Washington Redskins players
American people of Lithuanian descent